Brides of Funkenstein member Sheila Horne was hired as a back-up singer for original Brides Lynn Mabry and Dawn Silva in 1978. She became a main singer with Silva and Jeanette McGruder in 1979 for the second Brides album Never Buy Texas from a Cowboy and joined Rick James on tour in 1981 as an original Mary Jane. Horne wrote songs for George Clinton's solo albums on Capitol in the mid-1980s and, continues to tour with P-Funk All-Stars.  In Italy, in 1997 she released an album under the name Blackwood.

After returning to the U.S. she shifted back into American music, touring on several legs with P Funk. She teamed up with heavyweight producer Peter Rauhofer as the dance diva Amuka, to release 2003's dance anthem, "Appreciate Me," a hit that charted on Billboard's Top 10 and was licensed to CD compilations such as the Queer As Folk: Club Babylon soundtrack. Her second single with Peter Rauhofer  "U Ain't That Good," charted up to #3 on Billboard dance charts.  In 2003, she released an album with Discomind, The Fresh Turnout.

External links 
 [ Allmusic guide entry for Sheila Horne]
 [ Allmusic guide entry for Amuka]

American funk singers
P-Funk members
Living people
Year of birth missing (living people)